The Dohoin Usu Formation is a Late Cretaceous (Campanian) geologic formation in Mongolia. Dinosaur remains are among the fossils that have been recovered from the formation, although none have yet been referred to a specific genus.

Fossil content 
The formation has provided the following fossils:
Reptiles
 Goniopholididae indet.
 Hadrosauridae indet.
 Nanhsiungchelyidae indet.
Gastropods
 Gastropoda indet.

See also 
 List of dinosaur-bearing rock formations
 List of stratigraphic units with indeterminate dinosaur fossils

References

Bibliography 
  
 

Geologic formations of Mongolia
Upper Cretaceous Series of Asia
Cretaceous Mongolia
Campanian life
Shale formations
Sandstone formations
Paleontology in Mongolia